The 2018 EcoBoost 300 was the 33rd and final stock car race of the 2018 NASCAR Xfinity Series season, the championship race of that year, and the 24th iteration of the event. The race was held on Saturday, November 17, 2018, in Homestead, Florida at Homestead–Miami Speedway, a  permanent oval-shaped racetrack. The race took the scheduled 200 laps to complete. At race's end, JR Motorsports driver Tyler Reddick would take the lead after cunning pit strategy late in the race to win his first career NASCAR Xfinity Series championship, his 3rd win of his career in the series, and his second and final win of the season.

Background 
Homestead-Miami Speedway is a motor racing track located in Homestead, Florida. The track, which has several configurations, has promoted several series of racing, including NASCAR, the Verizon IndyCar Series, the Grand-Am Rolex Sports Car Series and the Championship Cup Series.

Since 2002, Homestead-Miami Speedway has hosted the final race of the season in all three of NASCAR's series: the Sprint Cup Series, Xfinity Series and Gander Outdoors Truck Series. Ford Motor Company sponsors all three of the season-ending races; the races have the names Ford EcoBoost 400, Ford EcoBoost 300 and Ford EcoBoost 200, respectively, and the weekend is marketed as Ford Championship Weekend. The Xfinity Series (then known as the Busch Series) has held its season-ending races at Homestead since 1995 and held it until 2020, when it was moved to Phoenix Raceway, along with NASCAR's other two series.

Championship drivers 

 Christopher Bell advanced after winning the 2018 Whelen Trusted to Perform 200.
 Cole Custer advanced after winning the 2018 O'Reilly Auto Parts 300.
 Daniel Hemric advanced by virtue of points.
 Tyler Reddick advanced by virtue of points.

Entry list 

*Driver changed to Landon Cassill for qualifying and the race.

Practice

First practice 
The first practice session was held on Friday, November 16, at 2:35 PM EST, and would last for 50 minutes.

Second and final practice 
The second and final practice session, sometimes referred to as Happy Hour, was held on Friday, November 16, at 5:05 PM EST, and would last for 50 minutes.

Qualifying 
Qualifying was held on Saturday, November 17, at 12:35 PM EST. Since Homestead–Miami Speedway is under 2 miles (3.2 km), the qualifying system was a multi-car system that included three rounds. The first round was 15 minutes, where every driver would be able to set a lap within the 15 minutes. Then, the second round would consist of the fastest 24 cars in Round 1, and drivers would have 10 minutes to set a lap. Round 3 consisted of the fastest 12 drivers from Round 2, and the drivers would have 5 minutes to set a time. Whoever was fastest in Round 3 would win the pole.

Five drivers would fail to qualify: Josh Williams, Stephen Leicht, Josh Bilicki, Bayley Currey, and Tim Viens.

Full qualifying results

Race results 

 Note: Christopher Bell, Cole Custer, Daniel Hemric, and Tyler Reddick are not eligible for stage points because of their participation in the Championship 4.

Stage 1 Laps: 45

Stage 2 Laps: 45

Stage 3 Laps: 110

References 

2018 NASCAR Xfinity Series
NASCAR races at Homestead-Miami Speedway
November 2018 sports events in the United States
2018 in sports in Florida